Chandra Kant Birla is an Indian industrialist and philanthropist. He is chairman of the CK Birla Group, a conglomerate operating across home and building products, automotive and technology, and healthcare and education.

Career
In addition to chairmanship of the group, CK Birla is the chairman of AVTEC, HIL, National Engineering Industries, Neosym, Orient Cement and Orient Paper & Industries. He also serves as member of the board of directors of the Commonwealth Business Council, chairman of the board of governors of the Birla Institute of Technology, Ranchi, chairman of the board of governors of the Indian Institute of Management, Udaipur and a trustee of The Calcutta Medical Research Institute. And the chairman of Gmmco Ltd. ( a dealership and partnership of caterpillar)

Under his direction the CK Birla Group has involved itself in philanthropic activities across science and technology, art and culture, and heritage preservation. The group also works to improve the livelihoods of rural and underprivileged communities in India.

Personal life

CK Birla is the son of Ganga Prasad Birla, and a member of the Birla family. He was educated at La Martiniere for Boys, Calcutta and Calcutta University. He is married to Amita Birla, daughter Raj Bagri, one of the founders of the London-based Metal Exchange. Amita sits on the boards of BirlaSoft, NBC Bearings and Birla Corporate Services.

See also
 CK Birla Group
 Birla
 Birla family

References

External links
CK Birla Hospital

Businesspeople from Delhi
Indian billionaires
Living people
Chandra Kant
Rajasthani people
1956 births
CK Birla Group